Sladenia is a genus of flowering plants containing tree species in the family Sladeniaceae found in Indo-China.

Species
There are two species in the genus Sladenia.

Sladenia celastrifolia
Sladenia integrifolia

References

Ericales genera
Sladeniaceae